"Bet I" is a song by American rapper B.o.B, taken from his debut studio album B.o.B Presents: The Adventures of Bobby Ray (2010).  The song, released April 20, 2010, as the fourth single from his debut album, features fellow Atlanta-based rappers T.I. and Playboy Tre. The song originally appeared on B.o.B's sixth mixtape May 25th (2010), minus a verse from T.I.

Music video 
The music video, directed by Gabriel Hart, was released on April 27, 2010.

Charts

References 

2010 singles
B.o.B songs
Songs written by B.o.B
T.I. songs
Songs written by T.I.
Grand Hustle Records singles
Music videos directed by Gabriel Hart
Atlantic Records singles
2010 songs